In anatomy, the middle temporal artery is a major artery which arises immediately above the zygomatic arch, and, perforating the temporal fascia, gives branches to the temporalis, anastomosing with the deep temporal branches of the internal maxillary.

It occasionally gives off a zygomatico-orbital branch, which runs along the upper border of the zygomatic arch, between the two layers of the temporal fascia, to the lateral angle of the orbit (the eye socket).

Additional images

References

Arteries of the head and neck